Megacraspedus separatellus is a moth of the family Gelechiidae. It is found from central and southern Europe to the Ural Mountains. Outside Europe it is found in the Altai Mountains, Turkey and the Caucasus.

Females are brachypterous.

References

Moths described in 1843
Megacraspedus
Moths of Europe
Insects of Turkey
Taxa named by Josef Emanuel Fischer von Röslerstamm